Ramón Pons (13 October 1940 – 21 April 2014) was a Spanish film, stage and television actor. He appeared in more than 15 films from 1970 on.

Filmography

Film
El espacio vacío (2009)
Los abrazos rotos (2009)
Escarabajos asesinos (1984)
Han violado a una mujer (1982)
El virgo de Visanteta (1979)
El sacerdote (1978)
La dudosa virilidad de Cristóbal (1977)
El avispero (1976)
Una abuelita de antes de la guerra (1975)
Los caballeros del botón de ancla (1974)
Juegos de sociedad (1974)
Ceremonia sangrienta (1973)
Murder in a Blue World (1973)
Experiencia prematrimonial (1972)
Los farsantes del amor (1972)
Señora casada necesita joven bien dotado (1971)
Un, dos, tres, al escondite inglés (1970)

Television
Policías, en el corazón de la calle (2000)
El comisario (2000)
Médico de familia (1999)
Periodistas (1999)
Entre naranjos (1998)
El súper (1997–1998)
Éste es mi barrio (1996)
Canguros (1996)
Los ladrones van a la oficina (1994)
 (1990)
Clase media (1987)
La voz humana (1986)
La comedia dramática española (1986)
Cuentos imposibles (1984)
Teatro breve (1980)
Novela (1975)
Noche de teatro (1974)
Ficciones (1972–74)
Hora once (1970–72)
Escritores en televisión (1968)
Estudio 1 (1967–81)
Historias para no dormir (1966)

References

External links

1940 births
2014 deaths
People from Valencia
Spanish male film actors
Spanish male television actors
Spanish male stage actors
20th-century Spanish male actors
21st-century Spanish male actors